The Tullamore Knights are a Rugby league team from Tullamore, Offaly, Ireland. The Knights play in the Irish Elite League. The Knights play their home games at Spollanstown Park, Tullamore.

See also

 Rugby league in Ireland
 List of rugby league competitions

External links

Irish rugby league teams
Sport in Tullamore
Sports clubs in County Offaly